Karizma (born Christopher Clayton on March 28, 1970, in Baltimore, Maryland) is an American electronic musician, DJ and record producer, known for his wide variety of music production in deep house, deep techno, hip hop, jazz, and broken beat.

Early career
Karizma grew up in Baltimore, United States, and he began to DJ for fashion shows and college parties at age of 13.

Karizma and DJ Spen worked on a music production project with a record label, Jasper Street Company, and joined the house-music production group the Basement Boys, and worked on remixes for musicians such as Mary J. Blige, Bob Sinclar, and Lenny Kravitz.

In October 1999, Karizma released his first solo work, "The Power E.P." from Black Vinyl Records, while he belong to the Basement Boys.

In 2006, Karizma distributed his unreleased track, "Twyst this" to a few contacts including Gilles Peterson. Gilles Peterson introduced it on his radio program, Worldwide on BBC Radio 1, and this track got chart in on top 14 in spite of it being on a white label record.

Albums and solo career
In 2007, Karizma released a solo album, "A Mind of Its Own" on R2 Records, and made his official debut.

Karizma was voted as Best DJ's of 2007 in the XLR8R magazine.

In 2010, Karizma was nominated as the "Best Hometown Hero" on his home town, Baltimore city newspaper for his solo career progression traveling around the globe.

In 2011, he produced a mix for FACT magazine, which lauded him as "one of the world's premiere house producers for well over a decade now".

In 2012, Karizma released a triple pack LP, "Karizma Collection 1999–2012", 500 copy limited editions including his classic songs, "Twysted" and "Power", individually hand sprayed each of the album sleeves.

In 2013, Karizma's third solo album, a double pack LP/ CD (digital), "Karizma Wall of Sound" was released from R2 Records on September 2, 2013, worldwide, featuring collaborations with Osunlade (Yoruba Records), Rokaz (Neil Pierce & Ziggy Funk), and a UK star, Sean McCabe.

In 2014, Karizma has spent a few good months working on his collaboration projects with Osunlade, Atjazz and Deetron to name a few.
Karizma's DJ performance as a former Basement Boys during Jasper St. Co. reunion live show during the Southport Weekender 50 and Camelot has also made fresh news in the industry.

In August 2014, Karizma entered "Hall of Fame" by Pete Tong on BBC Radio 1.

Monikers 
 Kohesive
 Kris Klayton
 DJ Karizma
 KaytroniK
 K2
 K-man
 Kayorcan
 Krystopher
 Karizma Ltd.

Collaboration units:
 Deepah Ones (DJ Spen)
 Izmabad (Simbad)
 Exist (Atjazz)

Selected discography

Albums 
 A Mind of Its Own, 2007
 A Mind of Its Own V2.0 – The Upgrade, 2009
 Wall of Sound, 2013
 Kaytronik Thee Album, 2016

Singles & EPs
 Scottie B & Karizma – Feel The Power, 1995
 Karizma – Kristical, 1996
 Sticky People / Karizma – Kong / Mamakossa, 1998
 Karizma – The Power EP, 1999
 Karizma – Shades Of "K" EP, 2000
 Karizma – Strings Emotional EP, 2004
 Karizma – Ride E.P., 2004
 Tedd Patterson Presents Blackbone / Karizma / Groove Assassins & DJ Raw –Re:Cuts Volume 4 Black Vinyl Deep, 2004
 Karizma – The Return Of The K-Man EP, 2005
 Karizma – In Tha D.ee.p, 2005
 Karizma / David Harness – Music / Say Yes, 2005
 Ferrer & Karizma Ltd. – The Cube, 2006
 Karizma – Kaytonik EP, 2006
 Karizma – The Damn Thing / Tech This Out Pt. 2, 2007
 Karizma – Groove A 'K' Ordingly, 2008
 Karizma – Necessary Maddness / Drumz Nightmare, 2009
 Karizma featuring Monique Bingham – Good Morning, 2010
 Karizma – The Power Remixes EP, 2012
 Karizma – Collection 1999–2011, 2012
 Karizma – Komplements EP, 2014
 Karizma featuring Osunlade - Hear And Now, 2014
 Karizma – Beats & Bobs vol 1 & 2, 2014
 Karizma – Beats & Bobs Vol. FR33, 2015
 Beats & Bobs Record Store Day Edition 10, 2015
 Beats & Bobs vol 5, 2015
 Beats & Bobs vol 6, 2016
 Karizma – The Power EP re-issue, 2017
 Karizma -Beats & Bobs Vol 7
 Karizma - Tech this out Re Release

DJ mix compilations 
 Karizma – Coast 2 Coast, 2007
 Kenny Dope* & Karizma – Soul Heaven Presents Kenny Dope & Karizma, 2007
 Karizma / Eddie Thoneick – Strictly Miami, 2010

Related artists/Group 
 The Basement Boys
 Exist

References

1970 births
Living people
American house musicians
Musicians from Baltimore
Club DJs